English rock band Arctic Monkeys have released seven studio albums, five extended plays, two video albums, 24 music videos and 23 singles. Formed in 2002 by guitarist and vocalist Alex Turner, guitarist and backing vocalist Jamie Cook, bass guitarist and backing vocalist Andy Nicholson and drummer and backing vocalist Matt Helders, Arctic Monkeys released their first EP, Five Minutes with Arctic Monkeys, in May 2005, and signed with London-based Domino Recording Company in June.

The band's first two singles on Domino, "I Bet You Look Good on the Dancefloor" and "When the Sun Goes Down", both peaked at number one on the UK Singles Chart. Their debut studio album, Whatever People Say I Am, That's What I'm Not, followed in January 2006 and reached number one on the UK Albums Chart, the Irish Albums Chart and the Australian Albums Chart. The British Phonographic Industry (BPI) certified the album seven times platinum. The band released a second EP, Who the Fuck Are Arctic Monkeys?, which was their last to be recorded with Nicholson, in April 2006; Nicholson officially departed in June, replaced by Nick O'Malley. Their first single after Nicholson's departure, "Leave Before the Lights Come On", reached number four on the UK Singles Chart.

Arctic Monkeys released their second studio album, Favourite Worst Nightmare, in April 2007. Favourite Worst Nightmare peaked atop the UK Albums Chart and the Irish Albums Chart. In the United States, the album peaked at number seven on the Billboard 200, their first top-ten entry. Two singles from the album, "Brianstorm" and "Fluorescent Adolescent", reached the top five on the UK Singles Chart. The band followed with their third studio album, Humbug, which was released in August 2009. Peaking atop the UK Albums Chart and the Irish Albums Chart, Humbug was preceded by the lead single "Crying Lightning", which reached number 12 on the UK Singles Chart. Their fourth studio album, Suck It and See (2011), was their fourth UK Albums Chart number one.

Arctic Monkeys' fifth studio album, AM (2013), peaked atop the Irish Albums Chart, the Australian Albums Chart and the New Zealand Albums Chart. In the United Kingdom, AM made Arctic Monkeys the first independent label band to earn five number-one albums and was certified four times platinum by the BPI. It earned platinum certifications by the Australian Recording Industry Association (ARIA; double platinum), the Irish Recorded Music Association (IRMA), the Recorded Music NZ (RMNZ) and the Recording Industry Association of America (RIAA). AM second single, "Do I Wanna Know?", was the band's first to be certified triple platinum by the BPI and platinum by the RIAA. Its third single, "Why'd You Only Call Me When You're High?", reached the UK Singles Chart top ten. The band's sixth studio album, Tranquility Base Hotel & Casino, peaked atop the UK Albums Chart.

Albums

Studio albums

Live albums

Other albums

Extended plays

Singles

Promotional singles

Other charted and certified songs

Music videos

Other appearances

Notes

References

discography
Discographies of British artists
Rock music group discographies